Eden Theological Seminary is a seminary of the United Church of Christ in Webster Groves, Missouri, near St. Louis, Missouri.

The seminary was established in 1850 by German pastors in what was then the American frontier. The pastors soon formed the German Evangelical Synod of North America. This, after subsequent mergers, became a part of the UCC. One of the early campuses in St. Louis became Normandy High School. The school was augmented by a merger with the Central Theological Seminary, an institution of the Reformed Church in the United States in Dayton, Ohio, in the 1930s, concurrent with the merger of the two denominations into the Evangelical and Reformed Church.

Conversations at Eden Theological Seminary, beginning in 1937, led to the 1957 merger of the E&R Church and the Congregational Christian Churches and the formation of the United Church of Christ. Notable alumni of Eden include Reinhold Niebuhr, H. Richard Niebuhr, Walter Brueggemann, Catherine Keller and Seth Senyo Agidi.

Eden Theological Seminary offers four degree programs: the Master of Divinity (M.Div.), the Master of Arts in Professional Studies (M.A.P.S), THE Master of Theological Studies (M.T.S.), and Doctor of Ministry (D.Min.). Eden's campus offers on-campus housing and dormitories to its student body.

External links
 Official website

References

German-American culture in Missouri
Seminaries and theological colleges in Missouri
Universities and colleges in St. Louis County, Missouri
Universities and colleges affiliated with the United Church of Christ
Reformed church seminaries and theological colleges
Educational institutions established in 1850
1850 establishments in Missouri
Buildings and structures in St. Louis County, Missouri